Bulgaria competed at the 2015 World Aquatics Championships in Kazan, Russia from July 21 to August 9, 2015.

High diving

Bulgaria has qualified one high diver at the World Championships.

Open water swimming

Bulgaria has qualified one swimmer to compete in the open water marathon.

Swimming

Bulgarian swimmers have achieved qualifying standards in the following events (up to a maximum of 2 swimmers in each event at the A-standard entry time, and 1 at the B-standard):

Men

Women

Synchronized swimming

Bulgaria has qualified two synchronized swimmers to compete in each of the following events.

References

External links
Bulgarian Swimming 

Nations at the 2015 World Aquatics Championships
2015 in Bulgarian sport
Bulgaria at the World Aquatics Championships